Seismo-electromagnetics are various electro-magnetic phenomena believed to be generated by tectonic forces acting on the earth's crust, and possibly associated with seismic activity such as earthquakes and volcanoes.  Study of these has been prompted by the prospect they might be generated by the increased stress leading up to an earthquake, and might thereby provide a basis for short-term earthquake prediction. However, despite many studies, no form of seismo-electromagnetics has been shown to be effective for earthquake prediction. A key problem is that earthquakes themselves produce relatively weak electromagnetic phenomena, and the effects from any precursory phenomena are likely to be too weak to measure. Close monitoring of the Parkfield earthquake revealed no significant pre-seismic electromagnetic effects. However, some researchers remain optimistic, and searches for seismo-electromagnetic earthquake precursors continue.

VAN method

The VAN method – named after P. Varotsos, K. Alexopoulos and K. Nomicos, authors of the 1981 papers describing it – measures low frequency electric signals, termed "seismic electric signals" (SES), by which Varotsos and several colleagues claimed to have successfully predicted earthquakes in Greece. Both the method itself and the manner by which successful predictions were claimed have been severely criticized and debated by VAN, but the critics have not retracted their views.

Since 2001, the VAN group has introduced a concept they call "natural time", applied to the analysis of their precursors. Initially it is applied on SES to distinguish them from noise and relate them to a possible impending earthquake. In case of verification (classification as "SES activity"), natural time analysis is additionally applied to the general subsequent seismicity of the area associated with the SES activity, in order to improve the time parameter of the prediction. The method treats earthquake onset as a critical phenomenon.

After 2006, VAN say that all alarms related to SES activity have been made public by posting at arxiv.org. One such report was posted on Feb. 1, 2008, two weeks before the largest earthquake in Greece during the period 1983–2011. This earthquake occurred on February 14, 2008, with magnitude 6.9. VAN's report was also described in an article in the newspaper Ethnos on Feb. 10, 2008. However, Gerassimos Papadopolous complained that the VAN reports were confusing and ambiguous, and that "none of the claims for successful VAN predictions is justified", but this complaint was answered on the same issue.

QuakeFinder and 'Freund physics'

In his investigations of crystalline physics, Friedemann Freund found that water molecules embedded in rock can dissociate into ions if the rock is under intense stress. The resulting charge carriers can generate battery currents under certain conditions. Freund suggested that perhaps these currents could be responsible for earthquake precursors such as electromagnetic radiation, earthquake lights and disturbances of the plasma in the ionosphere. The study of such currents and interactions is known as "Freund physics".

Most seismologists reject Freund's suggestion that stress-generated signals can be detected and put to use as precursors, for a number of reasons. First, it is believed that stress does not accumulate rapidly before a major earthquake, and thus there is no reason to expect large currents to be rapidly generated. Secondly, seismologists have extensively searched for statistically reliable electrical precursors, using sophisticated instrumentation, and have not identified any such precursors. And thirdly, water in the earth's crust would cause any generated currents to be absorbed before reaching the surface.

QuakeFinder is a company focused on developing  a system for earthquake prediction. The company has a long-standing collaboration with Freund. They have deployed a network of sensor stations that detect the electromagnetic pulses the team believes precede major earthquakes. Each sensor is believed to have a range of approximately 10 miles (16 km) from the instrument to the source of the pulses. As of 2016, the company says they have 125 stations in California, and their affiliate Jorge Heraud says he has 10 sites in Peru. Using these sensors, Heraud says that he has been able to triangulate pulses seen from multiple sites, in order to determine the origin of the pulses. He said that the pulses are seen beginning from 11 to 18 days before an impending earthquake, and have been used to determine the location and timing of future seismic events.

However, insofar as a verifiable prediction would require a publicly-stated announcement of the location, time, and size of an impending event before its occurrence, neither Quakefinder nor Heraud have yet verifiably predicted an earthquake, much less issued multiple predictions of the type that might be objectively testable for statistical significance.

Current research suggests it's dissolved gases that come out of solution when de-pressurized and then ionize to generate the electrical signatures.

Corralitos anomaly 

In the month prior to the 1989 Loma Prieta earthquake measurements of the earth's magnetic field at ultra-low frequencies by a magnetometer in Corralitos, California, just 7 km from the epicenter of the impending earthquake, started showing anomalous increases in amplitude. Just three hours before the quake the measurements soared to about thirty times greater than normal, with amplitudes tapering off after the quake. Such amplitudes had not been seen in two years of operation, nor in a similar instrument located 54 km away. To many people such apparent locality in time and space suggested an association with the earthquake.

Additional magnetometers were subsequently deployed across northern and southern California, but after ten years, and several large earthquakes, similar signals have not been observed.  More recent studies have cast doubt on the connection, attributing the Corralitos signals to either unrelated magnetic disturbance or, even more simply, to sensor-system malfunction.

Study of the closely monitored 2004 Parkfield earthquake found no evidence of precursory electromagnetic signals of any type.

ULF magnetic field precursors

Two recent studies by Konstantinos Eftaxias and his colleagues examined ULF magnetic fields preceding major earthquakes. At the  2011 Tohoku earthquake, ULF radiation exhibited critical behavior, while at the 2008 Sichuan earthquake, the researchers found a depression of the horizontal ULF magnetic field, which may also be interpreted as a manifestation of criticality.

TEC variations

Professor Kosuke Heki of Hokkaido University in Japan said that he discovered by accident that GPS signals changed about 40 minutes before the 2011 Tohoku-Oki earthquake. Reviewing historical data for other earthquakes, he found that this same correlation occurred during other incidents. He suggested that the GPS signals were detecting variations in the levels of the TEC (total electron content) of the ionosphere in the hour preceding an earthquake.

Satellite observations

The "Detection of Electro-Magnetic Emissions Transmitted from Earthquake Regions" satellite, constructed by CNES, has made observations which show strong correlations between certain types of low frequency electromagnetic activity and the most seismically active zones on the Earth, and have shown a sharp signal in the ionospheric electron density and temperature near southern Japan seven days before a 7.1 magnitude earthquake occurred there (on August 29 and September 5, 2004, respectively).

Quakesat is an earth observation nanosatellite based on 3 CubeSats. It was designed to be a proof-of-concept for collecting extremely low frequency earthquake precursor signals from space. The primary instrument is a magnetometer housed in a 2-foot (0.6 m) telescoping boom. The science behind the concept is disputed.

ESPERIA is an equatorial space mission mainly concerned with detecting any tectonic and preseismic related signals. More in general, it has been proposed for defining the near-Earth electromagnetic, plasma, and particle environment, and for studying perturbations and instabilities in the ionosphere-magnetosphere transition region. To study earthquake preparation processes and anthropogenic impacts in the Earth's surface, a phase A study has been realized for the Italian Space Agency.

The Deformation, Ecosystem Structure and Dynamics of Ice (DESDynI) radar satellite, which was canceled in the White House's 2012 budget proposal, would have the capacity to identify elastic strain in tectonic plates, combining L-band interferometric synthetic aperture radar and a multi-beam infrared lidar to detect strains in the Earth's surface that could lead to serious earthquakes.

Russia and the United Kingdom agreed to jointly deploy two satellites in 2015 that will measure electromagnetic signals that are released from the earth's crust prior to earthquakes. The project is said to be able to "help predict earthquakes and potentially save thousands of lives."

Another site of current research is China, where a satellite launch was planned for 2014, to provide data from ionospheric phenomena for comparison with seismo-electromagnetic phenomena on the ground.  Such a link is partially borne out in the current literature, with ionospheric phenomena already shown to precede seismic phenomena by a few hours to days.  The network would potentially show whether such ionospheric phenomena are sourced from ground electrical phenomena.

See also
Electrical resistivity tomography
Induced polarization
Magnetometer
Seismoelectrical method
Telluric current
VAN method

References

Sources 

 
 .
 .
.
 .
 .
 .
.
 .
 .

.
.

.
.

 .
 .
.

Further reading

Seismo electromagnetics: lithosphere-atmosphere-ionosphere coupling, Masashi Hayakawa, Oleg A. Molchanov, TerraPub, 2002, 
On the reported magnetic precursor of the 1989 Loma Prieta earthquake, Jeremy N. Thomas, Jeffrey J. Love, Malcolm J.S. Johnston, Phys. Earth Planet. Int., 173, 207–215, doi:10.1016/j.pepi.2008.11.014, 2009.
Ionospheric precursors of earthquakes, Sergey Pulinets, Kirill Boyarchuk, Springer, 2004, 
Electromagnetic Phenomenon Related to Earthquakes and Volcanoes, Birbal Singh, Narosa Pub. House, 2008, 17 Jun 2009, 
A Critical review of VAN: earthquake prediction from seismic electrical signals, James Lighthill, World Scientific, 1996, 
Monitoring of ULF (ultra-low-frequency) Geomagnetic Variations Associated with Earthquakes, Masashi Hayakawa, Katsumi Hattori and Kenji Ohta, Sensors 2007, 7, 1108–1122
Pre-earthquake ionospheric anomalies registered by continuous GPS TEC measurements, J. Y. Liu, Y. J. Chuo, S. J. Shan, Y. B. Tsai, Y. I. Chen, S. A. Pulinets, and S. B. Yu, Annales Geophysicae (2004) 22: 1585–1593

Geomagnetism
Seismology